Lithophyllum incrustans, also known by its common names coraline crust and paint weed, is a small pinkish species of seaweed.

Description
This is a small encrusting, calcareous alga, growing epiphytically as a flat lobed plant up to 10 cm in diameter and up to several mm forming thick adherent crusts. It can become knobbly with overlapping lobes and a smooth surface. In colour it is pinkish but may become bleached.

Reproduction
Tetrasporangial and bisporangial conceptacles occur sunken pits. Plants usually gametangial, Spermatangial conceptacles in shallow chambers. Carposporangial chambers flask-shaped.

Distribution
Found all around the Great Britain, Ireland, the Isle of Mann and the Channel Islands, rarer on the east coast of England. In Europe recorded from Faroes, Norway to the Mediterranean.

Ecology
Common in shallow pools and under cover. Grows abundantly in the mid-littoral to 8 metres depth.

References

Other External links
Dickinson, C.I. 1963. British Seaweeds. Eyre & Spottisqoode
Corallinaceae